The genus Acronema consists of 38 species of plants in the family Apiaceae found in the Sino-Himalayan region. Its also classified under the major group Angiosperms (flowering plants).

References 

Apioideae